Ramón Aldana del Puerto ( – ) was a Mexican journalist, playwright, lawyer, and politician.

He studied law and philosophy but became known for his work as a journalist and politician. He served as a Deputy in the Congress of the Union and a magistrate on the High Court of Justice of Yucatán and Veracruz. He wrote for numerous publications, including La Prensa, El País, El Pensamiento, La Guirnalda, El Álbum Yucateco, and La Biblioteca de Señoritas. He and his cousin Manuel Aldana Rivas co-founded the publication La Revista de Mérida in 1869 and sold it in 1873. Aldana published four plays: "Honor y felicidad," "Nobleza de corazón," "Una prenda de venganza," and "La cabeza y el corazón", the latter two of which were published in La Revista de Mérida.

Ramón Aldana del Puerto died on August 16, 1882 in Mexico City.

References 

Created via preloaddraft
Mexican non-fiction writers
19th-century Mexican journalists
Members of the Chamber of Deputies (Mexico)
1833 births
1882 deaths
Mexican male writers
19th-century Mexican writers
19th-century Mexican politicians
People from Mérida, Yucatán
Writers from Yucatán (state)
Politicians from Yucatán (state)